is located within Daisen Park, in Sakai-ku, Sakai City, in Osaka Prefecture.
The exhibition hall of approx. 1,330 square meters is divided up into areas for ancient times, the middle ages, early modern, and modern times.
The museum was opened in 1980, to commemorate the 90th anniversary of Sakai’s municipalization.
The present (2017-) director of the museum is Ken'ichi Sudo (ex-director and an emeritus professor at the National Museum of Ethnology). Susumu Nakanishi (Emeritus Professor at the International Research Center for Japanese Studies)  was a former (2008-2013) director of the museum.
 
The museum showcases Sakai’s history from ancient times to the present day, featuring artifacts excavated from the Mozu Kofun Group, represented by the Emperor Nintoku Tumulus (The Mozu Kofun Group was together with the Furuichi Kofun Group, inscribed as a UNESCO World Heritage Site as the Mozu-Furuichi Kofun Group: Mounded Tombs of Ancient Japan, on 6 July 2019.), goods and historical documents remaining from Sakai’s period of high trade as an autonomous city, and materials about Sakai-born historical characters, including Gyōki and Sen-no Rikyu.

The museum is located in Daisen Park, in the middle of the Mozu Kofun Group, along with the Sakai Municipal Library, Sakai Bicycle Museum, Sakai City Japanese Gardens, Sakai City Urban Greenification Center.
The International Research Centre for Intangible Cultural Heritage in Asia-Pacific Region opened its office in Sakai City Museum in 2011.

Facilities
Exhibition room 1 – Kofun and the Emperor Nintoku Tumulus (Kofun)
Exhibition room 2 – Prosperous Sakai in the Middle Ages
Exhibition room 3 – Sakai’s Culture and Industries in Early Modern to Modern Times
Exhibition room 4 – Festivals and Prayer, From the Museum Collection
Shin’an tea house (Registered tangible cultural property)  
Ōbaian tea house (Registered tangible cultural property)

Main exhibits
Sandalwood statue of Avalokitesvara (important cultural property) (Asuka period)
Lacquered drum-shaped sake barrel (important cultural property) (1473)
Emperor Nintoku’s sarcophagus (replica)
Emperor Nintoku's armor (replica)
Horse shaped Haniwa and Haniwa excavated from Emperor Nintoku’s Kofun (replica)
Iron artifacts excavated from the Otsukayama Kofun
Clay artifacts (haniwa) excavated from the Ryonan-akayama Kofun
Old European map of Japan
Model of “Sakai the city of freedom”
Sakai guns (matchlock guns)
Folding Screens "Festival of Sumiyoshi Taisha" (replica) (Original is usually in the storage room and displayed for a limited time)

Construction history
Founded – 1980
Completed – 1980
Design – Nikken Sekkei
Address –  2 Mozusekiun-cho, Sakai-ku, Sakai City, 590-0802

Access
8-minute walk from Mozu Station on the JR Hanwa Line

References

External links
Sakai City Museum

City museums in Japan
Museums in Osaka Prefecture
Sakai, Osaka
Museums established in 1980
1980 establishments in Japan